Palicourea microcarpa, synonym Rudgea microcarpa, is a species of plant in the family Rubiaceae. It is native to Bolivia and Peru.

Conservation
Rudgea microcarpa was assessed as "vulnerable" in the 1998 IUCN Red List, where it is said to be native only to Peru. , R. microcarpa was regarded as a synonym of Palicourea microcarpa, which has a wider distribution that includes Bolivia.

References

Flora of Bolivia
Flora of Peru
microcarpa
Taxonomy articles created by Polbot